Rune Olijnyk (born December 27, 1968) is a Norwegian former ski jumper who competed in the early 1990s. He won a silver medal in the individual large hill at the 1991 FIS Nordic World Ski Championships in Val di Fiemme and finished fourth in the team large hill event (along with Espen Bredesen, Kent Johanssen and Jon Inge Kjørum) at those same championships.

At the 1992 Winter Olympics in Albertville, Olijnyk finished seventh in the team competition. He won two Norwegian championship team large hill medals with gold in 1992 and silver in 1991, and won three straight bronze medals in the individual normal hill (1990, 1991 and 1992).

He represented the club Høland IL.

References 

1968 births
Living people
Norwegian male ski jumpers
Olympic ski jumpers of Norway
Ski jumpers at the 1992 Winter Olympics
FIS Nordic World Ski Championships medalists in ski jumping
20th-century Norwegian people